"Night Stalkers" is a song by American thrash metal band Megadeth. The song was released on July 22, 2022, as the second single from their sixteenth studio album, The Sick, the Dying... and the Dead!. The song features rapper Ice-T on guest vocals roughly halfway through the song.

Music and lyrics
On the song's lyrical content, frontman Dave Mustaine said, "It’s a brutal song. ‘Night Stalkers’ is about the 160th Battalion with the United States Army, and it’s all the black-ops helicopters that go in at night — nobody knows they’re there; they’re in, they’re out. And I had my buddy Ice-T join me on a part in the middle of it, because Ice was a ranger for the army, and he did two tours over in Afghanistan, I think it was."

Mustaine also commented, "I think that’s the fastest song we’ve ever done – 190 bpm... the song... needed that frantic pace because Night Stalker is a secret helicopter division of the military. They fly missions at night and no one knows what they’re gonna do until it happens."

Music video 
A music video was made for the song, the second of the three music videos leading up to the release of the album, chronicling the origins of the band's mascot Vic Rattlehead. The "Night Stalkers" music video shows Vic Rattlehead's transformation from a husband, father and soldier into an almost Darth Vader-esque monstrosity who exacts revenge on his enemies as he's haunted by memories from his past.

Personnel 
Megadeth
 Dave Mustaine – rhythm guitar, lead vocals, additional bass
 Kiko Loureiro – lead guitar, backing vocals, flute
 Dirk Verbeuren – drums

Additional musicians
 Steve Di Giorgio – bass
 Ice-T – guest vocals
 Eric Darken – percussion on tracks 
 Roger Lima – keyboards and effects

Production
 Dave Mustaine – co-production, engineering, art concept
 Chris Rakestraw – co-production, engineering
 Lowell Reynolds – assistant engineering
 Maddie Harmon – assistant engineering
 Rick West – drum technician 
 Josh Wilbur – mixing
 Ted Jensen – mastering

References

External links 
 "Night Stalkers: Chapter II" Music Video

Megadeth songs
2022 songs
Songs written by Kiko Loureiro
Songs written by Dave Mustaine